The Last Alarm may refer to:

 The Last Alarm (1926 film), American silent drama film
 The Last Alarm (1940 film), American crime film
 The Last Alarm (sculpture), public art work by Robert Daus